Testudo, the Mediterranean tortoises, are a genus of tortoises found in North Africa, Western Asia, and Europe. Several species are under threat in the wild, mainly from habitat destruction.

Background

They are small tortoises, ranging in length from 7.0 to 35 cm and in weight from 0.7 to 7.0 kg.

Systematics

The systematics and taxonomy of Testudo is notoriously problematic. Highfield and Martin commented:
Synonymies on Testudo are notoriously difficult to compile with any degree of accuracy. The status of species referred has undergone a great many changes, each change introducing an additional level of complexity and making bibliographic research on the taxa extremely difficult. Most early and not a few later checklists contain a very high proportion of entirely spurious entries, and a considerable number of described species are now considered invalid – either because they are homonyms, non-binomial or for some other reason.

Since then, DNA sequence data have increasingly been used in systematics, but in Testudines (turtles and tortoises), its usefulness is limited: In some of these, at least mtDNA is known to evolve more slowly in these than in most other animals. Paleobiogeographical considerations suggest the rate of evolution of the mitochondrial 12S rRNA gene is 1.0-1.6% per million years for the last dozen million years or so in the present genus and ntDNA evolution rate has been shown to vary strongly even between different population of T. hermanni; this restricts sequence choice for molecular systematics and makes the use of molecular clocks questionable.

The following extant species in the following subgenera are placed here:
 Genus Testudo
 Subgenus Agrionemys
 Russian tortoise or Horsfield's tortoise, T. horsfieldii
 Subspecies:
 Central Asian tortoise, T. horsfieldii horsfieldii
 Fergana Valley steppe tortoise, T. horsfieldii bogdanovi
 Kazakhstan steppe tortoise, T. horsfieldii kazakhstanica
 Turkmenistan steppe tortoise, T. horsfieldii kuznetzovi
 Kopet-Dag steppe tortoise, T. horsfieldii rustamovi
Subgenus Chersine
 Hermann's tortoise, T. hermanni
 Subspecies:
 Eastern Hermann's tortoise, T. hermanni boettgeri
 Western Hermann's tortoise, T. hermanni hermanni
 Subgenus Testudo
 Spur-thighed tortoise, Greek tortoise or common tortoise, T. graeca
 Subspecies:
 Mediterranean spur-thighed tortoise, T. graeca graeca
 Araxes tortoise, T. graeca armeniaca
 Buxton's tortoise, T. graeca buxtoni
 Cyrenaican spur-thighed tortoise, T. graeca cyrenaica
 Asia Minor tortoise, T. graeca ibera
 Morocco tortoise, T. graeca marokkensis
 Nabeul tortoise, T. graeca nabeulensis
 Souss Valley tortoise, T. graeca soussensis
 Mesopotamian tortoise, T. graeca terrestris
 Iranian tortoise, T. graeca zarudnyi
 Egyptian tortoise or Kleinmann's tortoise, T. kleinmanni
 Marginated tortoise, T. marginata

The first two are more distinct and ancient lineages than the closely related latter three species. Arguably, T. horsfieldii belongs in a new genus (Agrionemys) on the basis of the shape of its carapace and plastron, and its distinctness is supported by DNA sequence analysis. Likewise, a separate genus Eurotestudo has recently been proposed for T. hermanni; these three lineages were distinct by the Late Miocene as evidenced by the fossil record. Whether these splits will eventually be accepted remains to be seen. The genus Chersus has been proposed to unite the Egyptian and marginated tortoises which have certain DNA sequence similarities, but their ranges are (and apparently always were) separated by their closest relative T. graeca and the open sea and thus, chance convergent haplotype sorting would better explain the biogeographical discrepancy.

Conversely, the Greek tortoise is widespread and highly diverse. In this and other species, a high number of subspecies has been described, but not all generally accepted, and several (such as the "Negev tortoise" and the "dwarf marginated tortoise") are now considered to be local morphs. Some, such as the Tunisian tortoise, have even been separated as a separate genus Furculachelys, but this is not supported by more recent studies.

Mating 
Testudo spp. are promiscuous creatures and they follow a polyandrous mating system. Mating involves a courtship ritual of mechanical, olfactory and auditory displays elicited from the male to coerce a female into accepting copulation. Courtship displays are very energetically costly for males, especially because females tend to run away from courting males.
The male will chase her, exerting more energy and elaborate displays of ramming and biting. Females are able to judge a male's genetic quality through these displays; only healthy males are able to perform costly courting rituals, suggesting endurance rivalry. These are considered honest signals that are then used to influence pre- and post-copulatory choice, as females are the choosy sex.

Female mate choice offers no direct benefits (such as access to food or territory or parental care). There are, however, indirect benefits of mating with multiple males. Engaging in a polyandrous mating system offers a female guaranteed fertilization, higher offspring diversity and sperm competition to ensure that eggs are fertilized by a high quality male. This is in respect to the "good genes" hypothesis that females receive indirect benefits through her offspring by mating with a quality male, "a male's contribution to a female's fitness is restricted to [his] genes" (Cutuli, G. et al., 2014).
 
Mating order has no influence on paternity of a clutch so a female's inclination to mate with multiple males and her ability to store sperm allows for sperm competition and suggests cryptic female choice. However, some species do show size-assortative, T. marginata, for example, where large males breed with large females and small males breed with small females. Other species form hierarchies; during male-to-male competition the more aggressive male is considered alpha. Alpha males are more aggressive with their courting as well and have higher mounting success rate than beta males.

A female's reproductive tract contains sperm storage tubules and she is capable of storing sperm for up to four years. This sperm remains viable and when she goes a breeding season without encountering a male she is able to fertilize her eggs with the stored sperm. Storing sperm can also result in multiple paternity clutches; It is quite common among Testudo spp. females to lay a clutch that has been sired by multiple males. And females can lay one to four clutches a breeding season. 
Sexual dimorphism, promiscuity, long term sperm storage and elaborate courting rituals are factors that effect mate preference, sperm competition and cryptic female choice in genus Testudo.

References

External links 
Mediterranean tortoises
Tortoise Trust Web - Basic care of Mediterranean tortoises.

 
Turtle genera
Taxa named by Carl Linnaeus